Mohammad Furqan, is a Uttar Pradesh politician of the Bahujan Samaj Party is current mayor of Aligarh Municipal Corporation.

References

Year of birth missing (living people)
Living people
Place of birth missing (living people)
Bahujan Samaj Party politicians from Uttar Pradesh
Politicians from Aligarh
Mayors of places in Uttar Pradesh